JR Polytechnic is a college located in Alundur, Tiruchirappalli district. It was started in the year 2010 after having secured permission from the Govt. of Tamil Nadu, India.

Affiliations 
This college is affiliated with Directorate of Technical Education, Tamil Nadu.

Departments
There are five departments in this college.
Electrical and Electronics Engineering
Electronics and Communication Engineering
Automobile Engineering
Civil Engineering
Mechanical Engineering

References

External links
 

Colleges in Tamil Nadu
Education in Tiruchirappalli district
Educational institutions established in 2010
2010 establishments in Tamil Nadu